Sarcoptes is a genus of mites.

In some contexts, the types are all considered subordinate to Sarcoptes scabiei.
 Sarcoptes scabiei var. bovis
 S. s. var. canis
 S. s. var. caprae
 S. s. var. equi
 S. s. var. hominis
 S. s. var. ovis
 S. s. var. suis

In other cases, as with S. equi and S. anthracis, these are sometimes considered distinct species.

The term Sarcoptes canis appears in older references, but is now usually described as Sarcoptes scabiei var. canis or Sarcoptes scabiei canis.

References

Sarcoptiformes